Muji (Mu-chi;  / , formerly  / ) is a town in Pishan/Guma County, Hotan Prefecture, Xinjiang, China.

History

Before the Communist takeover, the area was organized as Muji District.

In 1958, Bayi Commune ('August 1 Army Day Commune' ) was established.

In 1978, Bayi Commune was renamed Muji Commune.

In 1984, Muji Commune became Muji Township.

In 2012/3, Muji was changed from a township into a town.

Administrative divisions
Koxtag includes three residential communities and eighteen villages:

Residential communities (Mandarin Chinese Hanyu Pinyin-derived names except where Uyghur is provided):
 Bazha, Wenhua, Tuanjie
Villages:
Longga (Longgacun;  / ), Langan, Yingbage, Kuonasayibage, Bashitiereke, Hantuge, Aziganbage, Gaziqiaka, Muji, Kuonatugeman, Sayi, Asa'er, Kuonabazha, Sayibage, Ayagebagela, Bagela, Bashibagela, Arejianggale

Transportation
 China National Highway 315

References

Populated places in Xinjiang
Township-level divisions of Xinjiang